Marco Antonio Bottoni, T.O.R. or Marco Antonio Bettoni was a Roman Catholic prelate who served as Auxiliary Bishop of Frascati (1655–?) and Titular Bishop of Coronea (1655–?).

Biography
Marco Antonio Bottoni was ordained a priest in the Third Order Regular. On 30 August 1655, he was appointed during the papacy of Pope Alexander VII as Auxiliary Bishop of Frascati and Titular Bishop of Coronea. On 14 September 1655, he was consecrated bishop by Giulio Cesare Sacchetti, Cardinal-Bishop of Frascati, with Giovanni Alfonso Puccinelli, Archbishop of Manfredonia, and Francesco Gheri, Bishop of Cervia, serving as co-consecrators. It is uncertain how long he served as Auxiliary Bishop of Frascati.

Episcopal succession

See also 
Catholic Church in Italy

References 

17th-century Italian Roman Catholic bishops
Bishops appointed by Pope Alexander VII